The Tarim babbler (Rhopophilus albosuperciliaris), also known as the Tarim hill warbler is a species of bird in the genus Rhopophilus. It is now thought to be a close relative of the parrotbills and is placed in the family Paradoxornithidae; previously, it was placed in the families Cisticolidae, Timaliidae or Sylviidae. It is endemic to China.

References

Tarim babbler
Birds of Western China
Endemic birds of China
Tarim babbler